The Nabataean Agriculture, also written The Nabatean Agriculture, is a 10th-century text on agronomy by Ibn Wahshiyya (died ), from Qussīn in present-day Iraq. It contains information on plants and agriculture, as well as on magic and astrology. It was frequently cited by later Arabic writers on these topics.

The Nabataean Agriculture was the first book written in Arabic about agriculture, and the most influential. Ibn Wahshiyya claimed that he translated it from a 20,000-year-old Mesopotamian text. Though some doubts remain, modern scholars believe that the work may be translated from a Syriac original of the 5th or 6th century AD. In any case, it is clear that the work is ultimately based on Greek and Latin agricultural writings, heavily supplemented with local material.

The work consists of some 1500 manuscript pages, principally concerned with agriculture but also containing lengthy digressions on religion, philosophy, magic, astrology, and folklore. Some of the most valuable agricultural material is that about vineyards, arboriculture, irrigation and soil science. This agricultural information became well known throughout the Arabic-Islamic world from Yemen to Spain.

The non-agricultural material in The Nabataean Agriculture paints a vivid picture of rural life in 10th-century Iraq. It describes a pagan religion with connections to ancient Mesopotamian beliefs, tempered by Hellenistic influences. Some of this non-agricultural material was cited by the Andalusian magician and alchemist Maslama al-Qurtubi (died 964) in his Ghayat al-Hakim ("The Goal of the Wise", Latin: Picatrix), while other parts were discussed by the Jewish philosopher Maimonides in his Guide for the Perplexed (c. 1190).

The French Orientalist Étienne Quatremère introduced the work to the European scholarly community in 1835. Most 19th-century scholars dismissed it as a forgery, but from the 1960s onward several researchers have shown increased interest in its authenticity and impact.

'Nabataean'

The word 'Nabataean' in the title of the work does not refer to the ancient Nabataeans, the northern Arab people who established a kingdom at Petra during the late Hellenistic period. Rather, 'Nabataean' is a term used by Arabic authors of the early Islamic period to designate the non-Arabic speaking, rural population of various conquered territories. Thus, we hear of 'Nabataean' Kurds and Armenians, as well as of 'Nabataeans of the Levant' (the term apparently used by Arabic authors for the ancient Nabataeans of Petra) and 'Nabataeans of Iraq'. Generally speaking, the term 'Nabataean' was strongly associated with a rural, sedentary way of life, which was perceived as backwards and as thoroughly opposed to the noble, nomadic lifestyle of the Arabs.

The term 'Nabataeans of Iraq' was used to refer to the rural, Aramaic-speaking, native inhabitants of central and southern Iraq (the ). However, it was also used by scholars like Ibn Wahshiyya (died ) and the historian al-Mas'udi (died 956) to refer to the ancient inhabitants of Mesopotamia, whom they believed to have spoken Syriac (a prestige form of Aramaic in the 10th century) and to have ruled over the land from the legendary times of Nimrod until the advent of the Sassanids in the 3rd century. Unlike the term 'Nabataeans of the Levant' then, the term 'Nabataeans of Iraq' did not refer to a historical people, but to an 'Aramaized' understanding of the Mesopotamian heritage.

Given the perceived antiquity of the 'Nabataean' culture of Iraq, Ibn Wahshiyya believed all human knowledge to go back on 'Nabataean' foundations. This idea itself was not exactly a new one: already in the Hellenistic period a secret knowledge was often attributed to the ancient inhabitants of Mesopotamia, referred to in Greek as 'Chaldaeans' (compare, for example, the Chaldaean oracles), a term used more or less as a synonym of 'Nabataean' by Ibn Wahshiyya and al-Mas'udi. However, in contrast to both earlier Hellenic authors and later Arabic authors such as Sa'id al-Andalusi (1029–1070), Ibn Wahshiyya was in direct contact with a living Mesopotamian tradition, making his 'Chaldaeans' or 'Nabataeans' more firmly rooted in empirical reality.

Ibn Wahshiyya took great pride in his 'Nabataeans', as well as in the nobility of peasants more generally. In this view it is an attempt to celebrate and preserve the 'Nabataean' heritage of Mesopotamia.

Composition

The work purports to have been compiled by a man named Ibn Wahshiyya from Qussīn, a village near Kufa in present-day Iraq. It includes a preface in which he gives an account of its origin. This preface states that he found the book in a collection of books from the Chaldeans, and that the original was a scroll with 1500 parchment sheets. The original bore the lengthy title  (“Book of Cultivation of the Land, the Care of Cereals, Vegetables and Crops, and their Protection”), which Ibn Wahshiyya abbreviated to Book of the Nabataean Agriculture. Ibn Wahshiyya claimed that he translated the work from an "ancient Syriac" ("") original, written c. 20,000 years ago by the ancient inhabitants of Mesopotamia. In Ibn Wahshiyya's time, Syriac was thought to have been the primordial language used at the time of creation. In reality, however, Syriac is a dialect of Eastern Aramaic that only emerged in the 1st century, although by the 9th century, it had become the carrier of a rich literature, including many works translated from the Greek. Ibn Wahshiyya said that he translated the text to Arabic in 903/4, and then dictated the translation to his student Abu Talib al-Zayyat in 930/1. These dates are probably accurate, because Ibn al-Nadim lists the book in his Kitab al-Fihrist ("The Book Catalogue") of 987, showing that the book was circulating in Iraq by the end of the 10th century.

Ibn Wahshiyya said that the book was the product of three "ancient wise Kasdanian men", of whom "one of them began it, the second added other things to that, and the third made it complete." These three compilers were named Saghrith, Yanbushad, and Quthama.

Scholarly opinion as to the authenticity of The Nabataean Agriculture has changed over time (see below). While it certainly does not date back to the Babylonian era as Ibn Wahshiyya himself claimed, scholars now believe that the work may actually have been an authentic translation from a pre-Islamic Syriac original. The Finnish scholar Jaakko Hämeen-Anttila proposed a three-stage textual history in 2006:  Reconstructing the sources used in the first stage is difficult because the author translated them loosely, added his own material and commentary, and used oral informants to supplement the written sources. However, they must have included a Syriac or Arabic translation of the 4th-century writer Vindonius Anatolius. The author may also have used local sources from outside the Graeco-Roman tradition, such as the lost Rusticatio of Mago the Carthaginian.

The Nabataean Agriculture was the first book written in Arabic about agriculture, although it was preceded by several books on botany and translations of foreign works on agriculture.

Contents

The book contains valuable information on agriculture and its associated lore. It is divided into approximately 150 chapters on olive trees, irrigation, flowers, trees, estate management, soils, legumes, and grains. Amidst its extensive agricultural material the text also contains religious, folkloric, and philosophical content. The style is "repetitive" and "not always completely lucid," according to Hämeen-Anttila; at the same time, Hämeen-Anttila notes that the author's attitude towards agriculture is "sober," and that he appears as a "learned and perspicacious observer." The ecologist Karl Butzer described the organization of the work as "perplexing", even "baffling", as when a treatise on corpses washed out of a cemetery interrupts the section on soils.

Agriculture

The overall structure of the agricultural information in The Nabataean Agriculture does not match the agricultural context of Mesopotamia, suggesting that the author modeled the work on texts from a Mediterranean environment. For example, the work provides limited coverage of sugar, rice, and cotton, which were the most important local crops in the 9th and 10th centuries. Sesame oil was more common in the region than olive oil, but Ibn Wahshiyya writes about the olive tree for 32 pages, compared to one page for sesame. Nevertheless, the geographic references and detailed information about weather, planting schedules, soil salinity, and other topics show that the author had firsthand knowledge of local conditions in the central Iraqi lowlands near Kufa.

The book describes 106 plants, compared to 70 in the contemporary Geoponica, and offers thorough information on their taxonomic characteristics and medicinal uses. The section on the cultivation of the date palm was an important contribution and wholly original, and the extremely detailed treatment of vineyards goes on for 141 pages. The list of exotic plants, some of which are native only to India or Arabia, may have been based on the botany portions of Pliny's 1st-century Natural History.

In soil science, The Nabataean Agriculture was more advanced than its Greek or Roman predecessors, analyzing the different soil types of the Mesopotamian plains (alluvial, natric, and saline), Syria (red clay), and the Zagros Mountains of northern Iraq (mountain soil). It provided accurate and original recommendations on soil fertilizer. In the area of hydrology and irrigation, the text offers "a treasure trove of information, ideas and subtle symbolism." Finally, there is a section on farm management, which shows evidence of Roman influence. Overall, the agronomic contributions of The Nabataean Agriculture are "substantial and far-ranging, including both agronomic and natural history data unknown in the Classical literature."

Religion and philosophy

In various passages the book describes the religious practices of rural Iraq, where paganism persisted long after the Islamic conquest. Some of the book's descriptions suggest links between these Iraqi pagans, whom Ibn Wahshiyya called 'Sabians', and ancient Mesopotamian religion. The cult recognized seven primary astral deities: the Sun, the Moon, and the five known planets (Jupiter, Saturn, Mercury, Venus, and Mars). Of these Jupiter and Venus were good (the Auspicious Ones), while Saturn and Mars were evil (the Nefarious Ones). The gods are all subordinated to the Sun, the supreme being. There are other gods besides the seven; the text describes the fixed stars such as Sirius as gods, and refers to the Mesopotamian god Tammuz as well as to Nasr, a pre-Islamic Arabian deity. Ibn Washiyya's description of the Tammuz ritual is particularly valuable, as it is more detailed than any other Arabic source. In this ritual, people would weep for Tammuz, who was "killed time after time in horrible ways," during the month of the same name. Ibn Wahshiyya also explains that the Christians of the region had a very similar practice, the Feast of Saint George, and speculates that the Christians may have adapted their custom from the Tammuz ritual.

The philosophical views of the author are similar to those of the Syrian Neoplatonist school founded by Iamblichus in the 4th century. The author believed that through the practice of esoteric rituals, one could achieve communion with God. However, the worldview of the text contains contradictions and reflects an author that is philosophically "semi-learned". One of the key philosophical passages is a treatise on the soul, in the section on vineyards, in which the author expresses doctrines very similar to those of Neoplatonism.

Magic

The author often describes magic in a negative light ("All the operations of the magicians are to me odious") and sometimes identifies magicians with a rival religious group, the "followers of Seth". Magic for the author consists of prayers to the gods, the creation of talismans, and manipulation of the special properties of things. These special properties depend on the configuration of the astral bodies and can produce effects such as making someone invisible or attracting goats and pigs to someone. The effects are specific to certain items, so broad beans are capable of curing "agonizing love," while ten dirhams of ground saffron mixed with wine will cause anyone who drinks it to laugh until they die. Some magical procedures rely on sympathetic magic instead of astrology, such as the technique for restoring a spring which is running dry by having young, beautiful women play music and sing near the spring. The most spectacular instance of magic is the case of a Nabataean magician who succeeded in creating an artificial man, in a story similar to the golem traditions of Kabbalistic Judaism.

Folklore and literature

The author frequently digresses from the main theme to tell folkloric tales, saying that he includes these both to instruct the reader and for entertainment, because "otherwise fatigue would blind [the reader's] soul." Many of the tales concern fantastical concepts such as talking trees or ghouls. Others are about Biblical characters or ancient kings, although the names of the kings are not those of any known historical kings, and the Biblical characters are altered from their customary forms. The tales are often related to agriculture, as when Adam teaches the Chaldeans to cultivate wheat, or King Dhanamluta plants so many water lilies in his castle that "the overabundance of water lilies around him, both their odour and their sight, caused a brain disease which proved fatal to him." There are some references to poetry, and fragments of debate poetry which are among the earliest in Arabic literature. Debate poetry is a genre in which two natural opposites such as day and night dispute their respective virtues. The examples in the text include boasts by olive trees and palm trees, and are similar in style to the Persian Drakht-i Asurig, a debate between a goat and a palm tree.  At times, the stories conceal a hidden inner meaning, as in a text purporting that the eggplant will disappear for 3000 years. The author explains that this is a symbolic expression in which the 3000 years signify three months, during which eating eggplant would be unhealthy.

Influence

The Nabataean Agriculture is the most influential book on agriculture in Arabic.  Dozens of writers used it as a source, from the Middle Ages until the 18th century. It was the first agronomical work to reach al-Andalus (modern Spain and Portugal), and became an important reference for the writers of the Andalusi agricultural corpus. Ibn al-Awwam in his Kitab al-filaha cited it over 540 times. Others who cited it include Jamāl al-Dīn al-Waṭwāṭ, Ibn Hajjaj, Abu l-Khayr, and al-Tighnari, and it influenced Ibn Bassal. The agricultural history of Yemen is not well known, but The Nabataean Agriculture must have reached Yemen by the era of the Rasulid dynasty, as demonstrated by quotations in the work of al-Malik al-Afdal al-Abbas (d. 1376).

The Nabataean Agriculture also had a far-reaching impact on Arabic and Latin occult literature, through the fragments quoted in the Ghayat al-hakim ("The Goal of the Wise") by the Cordoban magician, alchemist and hadith scholar Maslama al-Qurtubi (died 964), an influential work on magic which was later translated into Latin under the title Picatrix.

In the 12th century Maimonides quoted The Nabataean Agriculture in his Guide for the Perplexed, as a source on pagan religion. Later translations of Maimonides into Latin mistranslated the name of the work as De agricultura Aegyptiorum ("On Egyptian Agriculture"), which caused readers such as Gottfried Wilhelm Leibniz and Samuel Purchas to refer to the book by this erroneous title. According to Ernest Renan, the book was also cited by Thomas Aquinas in the 13th century. In the 14th century, Ibn Khaldun mentioned the work in his Muqaddimah, although he believed that it had been translated from Greek.

Traces of Ibn Wahshiyya's influence also appear in Spanish literature. Alfonso X of Castile (1221–1284) commissioned a Spanish translation of an Arabic lapidary (book about gemstones) by someone named Abolays. This lapidary cites The Nabataean Agriculture (calling it The Chaldaean Agriculture), and Abolays claims, like Ibn Wahshiyya, to have translated the lapidary from an ancient language ("Chaldaean"). In the 15th century, Enrique de Villena also knew of The Nabataean Agriculture and referenced it in his Tratado del aojamiento and Tratado de lepra.

History of modern scholarship

19th century

The Nabataean Agriculture was first introduced to European scholarship in 1835 by the French scholar Étienne Quatremère. Daniel Chwolson popularized it in his studies of 1856 and 1859, believing that it provided authentic information about ancient Assyria and Babylonia. He dated the original text to the 14th century BC at the latest. However, his views provoked a "violent reaction" in the scholarly community, and a series of scholars set out to refute him. The first of these was Ernest Renan in 1860, who dated the work to the 3rd or 4th century. He was followed by Alfred von Gutschmid, who showed inconsistencies in the text and declared it a forgery of the Muslim era. In an article published in 1875, the eminent German scholar Theodor Nöldeke agreed with Gutschmid that the work was originally written in Arabic, going as far as to argue that Ibn Wahshiyya himself was a fiction, and that the true author was Abu Talib al-Zayyat. Nöldeke emphasized the Greek influences in the text, the author's knowledge of the calends (a feature of the Roman calendar), and his use of the solar calendar of Edessa and Harran rather than the Islamic lunar calendar. The eventual decipherment of cuneiform showed conclusively that The Nabataean Agriculture was not based on an ancient Mesopotamian source.

20th and 21st centuries

Interest in the book was slight for the first half of the 20th century. Martin Plessner was one of the few scholars to devote attention to it, in an article published in 1928. Toufic Fahd began studying the work in the late 1960s, and wrote many articles on it in which he defended the idea that the text was not a forgery by Ibn Wahshiyya, but was rather based on a pre-Islamic original. Fuat Sezgin also defended the work's authenticity as a translation from a 5th- or 6th-century work, and published a facsimile of the manuscript in 1984, while Fahd completed his critical edition of the text between 1993 and 1998. Mohammad El-Faïz supported Fahd's views and studied the work from the standpoint of Mesopotamian agriculture, publishing a monograph on the subject in 1995. Despite the fact that several scholars had now argued for the work's authenticity, Nöldeke's views still had the most currency in the early 21st century. This changed when Jaakko Hämeen-Anttila, in his monograph published in 2006, extensively argued that the work may well have been an authentic translation from the Syriac. The Nabataean Agriculture has not been translated into a European language in full, but Fahd translated parts of it in to French in his articles, and Hämeen-Anttila translated other parts into English.

See also
Andalusi agricultural corpus
Arab Agricultural Revolution
History of agriculture
 History of botany
Islam and magic

Notes

References

Bibliography

Further reading

Editions
 (3 vols., 1993–1998.)

External links
 Ibn Wahshiyya at the Filaha Texts Project – contains bibliography and list of manuscripts
 Digitized manuscript at the Berlin State Library, 1058
 Digitized manuscript at the Berlin State Library, 14th century
 Bodleian Library MS. Huntington 326 – facsimile of a medieval Arabic manuscript containing the text

10th-century Arabic books
Agriculture books
Alchemical documents
Alchemical works of the medieval Islamic world
Medieval texts
Works of uncertain authorship